The G postcode area, also known as the Glasgow postcode area, is a group of postcode districts in central Scotland, within five post towns. These districts are primarily centered on Glasgow itself, and West Dunbartonshire (including Dumbarton, Clydebank and Alexandria), plus parts of the council areas of Argyll and Bute (including Arrochar and Helensburgh), East Dunbartonshire, North Lanarkshire, South Lanarkshire, East Renfrewshire and Stirling.

Former postal districts and their legacy
From 1923 until the introduction of the national postcode system in the late 1960s, Glasgow was divided into (mostly) numbered postal districts for its central and surrounding parts identified by compass-point letters: C1–C5 (corresponding to current postcode districts G1–G5), W1–W5 (G11–G15), NW (G20), N1–N3 (G21–G23), E1–E4 (G31–G34), SE (G40), S1–S6 (G41–G46) and SW1–SW3 (G51–G53).

Coverage
The approximate coverage of the postcode districts:

|-
| G1
| GLASGOW
| Former C1 district: Merchant City
| Glasgow City
|-
| G2
| GLASGOW
| Former C2 district: Blythswood Hill, Anderston (part)
| Glasgow City
|-
| G3
| GLASGOW
| Former C3 district: Anderston, Finnieston, Garnethill, Park, Woodlands (part), Yorkhill
| Glasgow City
|-
| G4
| GLASGOW
| Former C4 district: Calton (part), Cowcaddens (part), Drygate, Kelvinbridge, Townhead, Woodlands (part), Woodside (part)
| Glasgow City
|-
| G5
| GLASGOW
| Former C5 district: Gorbals
| Glasgow City
|-
| style="background:#FFFFFF;"|G9
| style="background:#FFFFFF;"|GLASGOW
| style="background:#FFFFFF;"|Newspaper Competitions
| style="background:#FFFFFF;"|non-geographic
|-
| G11
| GLASGOW
| Former W1 district: Broomhill, Partick, Partickhill
| Glasgow City
|-
| G12
| GLASGOW
| Former W2 district: West End (part), Cleveden, Dowanhill, Hillhead, Hyndland, Kelvindale, Kelvinside, Botanic Gardens, University of Glasgow
| Glasgow City
|-
| G13
| GLASGOW
| Former W3 district: Anniesland, Knightswood, Yoker
| Glasgow City
|-
| G14
| GLASGOW
| Former W4 district: Whiteinch, Scotstoun
| Glasgow City
|-
| G15
| GLASGOW
| Former W5 district: Drumchapel
| Glasgow City
|-
| G20
| GLASGOW
| Former NW district: Maryhill, North Kelvinside, Ruchill
| Glasgow City
|-
| G21
| GLASGOW
| Former N1 district: Balornock, Barmulloch, Cowlairs, Royston, Springburn, Sighthill
| Glasgow City
|-
| G22
| GLASGOW
| Former N2 district: Milton, Parkhouse, Possilpark
| Glasgow City
|-
| G23
| GLASGOW
| Former N3 district: Lambhill, Summerston
| Glasgow City
|-
| G31
| GLASGOW
| Former E1 district: Dennistoun, Haghill, Parkhead (part) 
| Glasgow City
|-
| G32
| GLASGOW
| Former E2 district: Carmyle, Tollcross, Mount Vernon, Lightburn, Sandyhills, Shettleston, Springboig
| Glasgow City
|-
| G33
| GLASGOW
| Former E3 district: Cardowan, Carntyne, Craigend, Cranhill, Garthamlock, Millerston, Provanmill, Queenslie, Riddrie, Robroyston, Ruchazie, Stepps, Wellhouse
| North Lanarkshire, Glasgow City
|-
| G34
| GLASGOW
| Former E4 district: Easterhouse, Easthall, Provanhall
| Glasgow City
|-
| G40
| GLASGOW
| Former SE district: Bridgeton, Calton, Dalmarnock
| Glasgow City
|-
| G41
| GLASGOW
| Former S1 district: Pollokshields, Shawlands
| Glasgow City
|-
| G42
| GLASGOW
| Former S2 district: Battlefield, Govanhill, Mount Florida, Strathbungo (part), Toryglen
| Glasgow City
|-
| G43
| GLASGOW
| Former S3 district: Mansewood, Newlands, Pollokshaws, Cowglen
| Glasgow City
|-
| G44
| GLASGOW
| Former S4 district: Cathcart, Simshill, Croftfoot, King's Park, Muirend, Netherlee
| Glasgow City, East Renfrewshire
|-
| G45
| GLASGOW
| Former S5 district: Castlemilk
| Glasgow City
|-
| G46
| GLASGOW
| Former S6 district: Arden, Carnwadric, Deaconsbank, Giffnock, Kennishead, Thornliebank, northeast Newton Mearns, Regents Park
| East Renfrewshire, Glasgow City 
|-
| G51
| GLASGOW
| Former SW1 district: Govan, Ibrox, Drumoyne, Cessnock, Plantation
| Glasgow City
|-
| G52
| GLASGOW
| Former SW2 district: Cardonald, Hillington, Penilee, Mosspark
| Glasgow City
|-
| G53
| GLASGOW
| Former SW3 district: Darnley, Pollok, Crookston, Parkhouse, Priesthill, Nitshill, Southpark 
| Glasgow City
|-
| style="background:#FFFFFF;"|G58
| style="background:#FFFFFF;"|GLASGOW
| style="background:#FFFFFF;"|National Savings and Investments, Cowglen
| style="background:#FFFFFF;"|non-geographic
|-
| G60
| GLASGOW
| Bowling, Old Kilpatrick
| West Dunbartonshire
|-
| G61
| GLASGOW
| Bearsden
| East Dunbartonshire
|-
| G62
| GLASGOW
| Baldernock, Milngavie, Mugdock
| East Dunbartonshire, Stirling
|-
| G63
| GLASGOW
| Balfron, Balmaha, Blanefield, Croftamie, Drymen, Dumgoyne, Fintry, Killearn, Rowardennan, Strathblane
| Stirling
|-
| G64
| GLASGOW
| Bishopbriggs, Torrance
| East Dunbartonshire
|-
| G65
| GLASGOW
| Croy, Kilsyth, Twechar
| North Lanarkshire, East Dunbartonshire 
|-
| G66
| GLASGOW
| Clachan of Campsie, Haughhead, Kirkintilloch, Lennoxtown, Lenzie, Milton of Campsie, Auchinloch
| East Dunbartonshire, North Lanarkshire 
|-
| G67
| GLASGOW
| Cumbernauld (south)
| North Lanarkshire
|-
| G68
| GLASGOW
| Cumbernauld (north), Dullatur 
| North Lanarkshire
|-
| G69
| GLASGOW
| Baillieston, Bargeddie, Chryston, Garrowhill, Gartcosh, Gartloch, Moodiesburn, Muirhead, Springhill
| Glasgow City, North Lanarkshire
|-
| style="background:#FFFFFF;"|G70
| style="background:#FFFFFF;"|GLASGOW
| style="background:#FFFFFF;"|HM Revenue and Customs, Cumbernauld
| style="background:#FFFFFF;"|non-geographic
|-
| G71
| GLASGOW
| Birkenshaw, Bothwell, Broomhouse, Tannochside, Uddingston, Viewpark
| Glasgow City, North Lanarkshire, South Lanarkshire 
|-
| G72
| GLASGOW
| Blantyre, Cambuslang
| South Lanarkshire
|-
| G73
| GLASGOW
| Rutherglen
| South Lanarkshire
|-
| G74
| GLASGOW
| East Kilbride (north), Thorntonhall
| South Lanarkshire
|-
| G75
| GLASGOW
| Auldhouse, East Kilbride (south)
| South Lanarkshire
|-
| G76
| GLASGOW
| Busby, Carmunnock, Clarkston, Eaglesham, Waterfoot
| East Renfrewshire, Glasgow City, very small parts of South Lanarkshire
|-
| G77
| GLASGOW
| Newton Mearns
| East Renfrewshire
|-
| G78
| GLASGOW
| Barrhead, Neilston, Uplawmoor
| East Renfrewshire, very small parts of East Ayrshire and North Ayrshire
|-
| style="background:#FFFFFF;"|G79
| style="background:#FFFFFF;"|GLASGOW
| style="background:#FFFFFF;"|HM Revenue and Customs, East Kilbride
| style="background:#FFFFFF;"|non-geographic
|-
| G81
| CLYDEBANK
| Dalmuir, Duntocher, Faifley, Hardgate
| West Dunbartonshire
|-
| G82
| DUMBARTON
| Cardross, Milton, Renton
| West Dunbartonshire, Argyll and Bute
|-
| G83
| ALEXANDRIA; ARROCHAR
| Alexandria, Arrochar, Aldochlay, Ardlui, Balloch, Bonhill, Gartocharn, Inverarnan, Jamestown, Luss, Tarbet
| West Dunbartonshire, Argyll and Bute, Stirling
|-
| G84
| HELENSBURGH
| Clynder, Cove, Garelochhead, Kilcreggan, Rhu, Rosneath, Shandon
| Argyll and Bute
|-
| style="background:#FFFFFF;"|G90
| style="background:#FFFFFF;"|GLASGOW
| style="background:#FFFFFF;"|Department for Work and Pensions
| style="background:#FFFFFF;"|non-geographic
|}

Map

See also
Postcode Address File
List of postcode areas in the United Kingdom

References

External links
Royal Mail's Postcode Address File
A quick introduction to Royal Mail's Postcode Address File (PAF)

Glasgow
Dumbarton
Postcode areas covering Scotland